Oxford Township is one of the eighteen townships of Delaware County, Ohio, United States. As of the 2010 census the population was 987, up from 854 at the 2000 census.

Geography
Located in the northern part of the county, it borders the following townships:
Westfield Township, Morrow County - north
Peru Township, Morrow County - east
Kingston Township - southeast corner
Brown Township - south
Troy Township - southwest
Marlboro Township - northwest

The village of Ashley occupies part of northeastern Oxford Township.

Name and history
Oxford Township was founded in 1815.

It is one of six Oxford Townships statewide.

Government
The township is governed by a three-member board of trustees, who are elected in November of odd-numbered years to a four-year term beginning on the following January 1. Two are elected in the year after the presidential election and one is elected in the year before it. There is also an elected township fiscal officer, who serves a four-year term beginning on April 1 of the year after the election, which is held in November of the year before the presidential election. Vacancies in the fiscal officership or on the board of trustees are filled by the remaining trustees.

References

External links
County website

Townships in Delaware County, Ohio
Townships in Ohio